Benjamin Ipavec (24 December 1829 – 20 December 1908) was one of the foremost Slovene Romantic composers. A native of Šentjur, he lived in that town for much of his life. He was a physician in his professional life; as a composer he wrote mainly small choral pieces for amateur forces. He wrote the first Slovene operetta, titled . His brother Gustav and nephew Josip were both active as physicians and composers as well. Ipavec died in Graz on 20 December 1908 and he was buried there two days later.

See also
List of Slovenian composers

References

External links

1829 births
1908 deaths
Romantic composers
Slovenian classical composers
Slovenian male musicians
19th-century Slovenian physicians
Male classical composers
People from Šentjur
20th-century male musicians
19th-century male musicians